John Vandling Lesher (July 27, 1866 – May 3, 1932) was a Democratic member of the U.S. House of Representatives from Pennsylvania.

Biography
Lesher was born on a farm in Blue Hill, Pennsylvania.  He attended the rural schools in his native county and the State Normal School at Bloomsburg, Pennsylvania.  He taught school for several years in Union and Snyder Counties.  He graduated from Bucknell University in Lewisburg, Pennsylvania, in 1897.  He enlisted in Company K of the Pennsylvania National Guard in 1898, and when it was transferred to the Twelfth Regiment he served as a first lieutenant.  He was promoted to quartermaster with rank of captain, serving until 1902.  He studied law, was admitted to the bar in 1900 and commenced practice in Sunbury, Pennsylvania.  He served as the assistant district attorney of Northumberland County, Pennsylvania.  He was also engaged in banking and real estate development.

Lesher was elected as a Democrat to the sixty-third and to the three succeeding congresses.  He was an unsuccessful candidate for reelection in 1920.  He resumed the practice of law in Sunbury, Pennsylvania, and died in Danville, Pennsylvania.  Interment in Riverview Cemetery in Northumberland, Pennsylvania.

Sources

The Political Graveyard

1866 births
1932 deaths
People from Union County, Pennsylvania
Pennsylvania lawyers
Democratic Party members of the United States House of Representatives from Pennsylvania
Bloomsburg University of Pennsylvania alumni
Quartermasters